John Kourkouas may refer to:

John Kourkouas (9th century), 9th-century Byzantine general
John Kourkouas, 10th-century Byzantine commander-in-chief, grandson of the previous
John Kourkouas (died 971), 10th-century Byzantine general, grandson of the previous
John Kourkouas (catepan), 11th-century Byzantine governor of Italy